Douzains is a commune in the Lot-et-Garonne, a department in the Nouvelle-Aquitaine ("New Aquitaine") region in south-western France.

Geography
Douzains is located 48 km north of Agen, the capital of the department Lot-et-Garonne. The nearest town with amenities is Castillonnès, 5.5 km away.

See also
Communes of the Lot-et-Garonne department

References

Communes of Lot-et-Garonne